Yurino (Jürnö; , Jürnÿ) is an urban locality (an urban-type settlement) and the administrative center of Yurinsky District of the Mari El Republic, Russia, located on the Cheboksary Reservoir, near the confluence of the Volga and Vetluga Rivers. As of the 2010 Census, its population was 3,465.

Administrative and municipal status
Within the framework of administrative divisions, Yurino serves as the administrative center of Yurinsky District. As an administrative division, the urban-type settlement of Yurino is incorporated within Yurinsky District as Yurino Urban-Type Settlement (an administrative division of the district). As a municipal division, Yurino Urban-Type Settlement is incorporated within Yurinsky Municipal District as Yurino Urban Settlement.

Notable residents 

Nina Makarova (1908–1976), composer

References

Notes

Sources

Urban-type settlements in the Mari El Republic
